The Kingsport Area Transit System, calling itself KATS, is the primary provider of mass transportation in Kingsport, Tennessee. The agency was established in 1995 and currently has five routes. Service operates on weekdays only, and all buses originate from a city center terminal.

Routes
1 Downtown to Stone Dr
2 Downtown to Ft Henry Dr
3 Downtown to East Stone Commons
4 Downtown to Target Plaza
5 Downtown to Bradley St

References
KATS

Bus transportation in Tennessee
Kingsport, Tennessee
1995 establishments in Tennessee